Cromwell is an unincorporated community in Pierce County, in the U.S. state of Washington.

History
A post office called Cromwell was established in 1903, and remained in operation until 1931. The community was named after J. B. Cromwell, a postal official.

References

Unincorporated communities in Pierce County, Washington
Unincorporated communities in Washington (state)